The 1914 Kentucky Derby was the 40th running of the Kentucky Derby. The race took place on May 9, 1914.  Betting favorite Old Rosebud led the entire race, winning by eight lengths. The winning time of 2.03.40 set a new Derby record, which smashed the previous year's record set by longshot Donerail. Churchill Downs president Matt Winn channeled Old Rosebud's record setting run into considerable publicity for the Derby.

Full results

Winning Breeder: John E. Madden; (KY)
Horses Ivan Gardner, Brickley, Belloc, and Constant scratched before the race

Payout

 The winner received a purse of $9,125.
 Second place received $2,000.
 Third place received $1,000.

References

1914
Kentucky Derby
Derby
May 1914 sports events